Carlton William East (August 27, 1894 – January 15, 1953) was an outfielder and pitcher in Major League Baseball. He played for the St. Louis Browns and Washington Senators.

References

External links

1894 births
1953 deaths
Major League Baseball outfielders
Major League Baseball pitchers
St. Louis Browns players
Washington Senators (1901–1960) players
Baseball players from Marietta, Georgia
Minor league baseball managers
Montgomery Rebels players
Rome Romans players
Thomasville Hornets players
Little Rock Travelers players
Lincoln Tigers players
Lincoln Links players
Sioux City Indians players
Wichita Jobbers players
Wichita Witches players
Minneapolis Millers (baseball) players
Chattanooga Lookouts players
Anniston Nobles players